Gorgobina was a Celtic oppidum (fortified city) on the territory of the Aedui tribe. After the defeat of the Helvetii in 58 BC at nearby Bibracte, the Helvetians' Boii allies settled there (Julius Caesar, Commentarii de Bello Gallico, I., 28). Whether this really was an act of clemency on Julius Caesar's part may be disputed. With the Aedui being allies of Rome, Vercingetorix besieged Gorgobina in the course of his campaign:

Hac re cognita Vercingetorix rursus in Bituriges exercitum reducit atque inde profectus Gorgobinam, Boiorum oppidum, quos ibi Helvetico proelio victos Caesar collocaverat Haeduisque attribuerat, oppugnare instituit.

(Translation:) With this in mind, Vercingetorix led his army back to the territory of the Bituriges and advanced from there to Gorgobina, the oppidum of the Boii – whom, defeated in the battle of the Helvetians, Caesar had installed there and assigned to the Aedui –, and laid siege to it.

In the last great battle of the Gallic War, the Boii of Gorgobina sent two thousand warriors to support Vercingetorix (Commentarii de Bello Gallico, VII, 75).

Location

The exact location of Gorgobina is still unclear. It might be modern Saint-Parize-le-Châtel or La Guerche (Nièvre).

According to T. Rice Holmes, Napoleon III argued for Saint-Parize-le-Châtel, Bonniard for ruins near Saint Reverien, Creuly for Sancerre. and von Göler for La Guerche-sur-l'Aubois.

References

A. Genier, À la recherche de Gorgobina, REA 44, 1942, 116.

Further reading 
Gorgobina

Former populated places in France
Aedui
Boii